Timotheus Josephus Verschuur (18 March 1886, Utrecht – 17 April 1945, Sachsenhausen) was a Dutch politician.

References
VERSCHUUR, Timotheus Josephus (1886-1945) at the Biografisch Woordenboek van Nederland

1886 births
1945 deaths
Ministers of Social Affairs of the Netherlands
Members of the House of Representatives (Netherlands)
Politicians from Utrecht (city)
Utrecht University alumni
Dutch Roman Catholics
Roman Catholic State Party politicians
20th-century Dutch politicians
People who died in Sachsenhausen concentration camp
Politicians who died in Nazi concentration camps
Dutch civilians killed in World War II